Anja Stridsman is a Swedish-born Australian boxer. She won the women's 60-kilogram class gold medal at the 2018 Commonwealth Games.

References

1987 births
Living people
People from Luleå
Australian women boxers
Lightweight boxers
Boxers at the 2018 Commonwealth Games
Commonwealth Games gold medallists for Australia
Commonwealth Games medallists in boxing
Medallists at the 2018 Commonwealth Games